Enzo Mainardi (30 July 1898 – 16 November 1983) was an Italian painter and poet. He was an important member of the Futurist movement.

He was the father of Danilo Mainardi.

Paintings

External links 

Italian Futurist painters
Futurist writers
1898 births
1983 deaths
Italian Futurism
Italian male painters
Italian male poets
20th-century Italian painters
20th-century Italian poets
Painters from Cremona
20th-century Italian male writers
Writers from Cremona
20th-century Italian male artists